SuperCoach may refer to:

 AFL SuperCoach 
 NRL SuperCoach